Legislative elections were held in El Salvador on 31 March 1985. The result was a victory for the Christian Democratic Party, which won 33 of the 60 seats. Voter turnout was 42%.

Results

References

Bibliography
Political Handbook of the world, 1985. New York, 1986.
Acevedo, Carlos. 1991. "Las novedades de las elecciones del 10 de marzo." Estudios centroamericanos (ECA) 46, 507-508:71-76 (enero-febrero 1991).
Arriaza Meléndez, Jorge. 1989. Historia de los procesos electorales en El Salvador (1811–1989). San Salvador: Instituto Salvadoreño de Estudios Políticos.
Benítez Manaut, Raúl. 1990. "El Salvador: un equilibrio imperfecto entre los votos y las botas." Secuencia 17:71-92 (mayo-agosto de 1990).
Córdova M., Ricardo. 1988. "Periodización del proceso de crisis (1979-1988)." El Salvador: guerra, política y paz (1979–1988). 1988. San Salvador: Graffiti. Pages 83–97 plus statistical tables.
Eguizábal, Cristina. 1992. "Parties, programs, and politics in El Salvador." Goodman, Louis W., ed. 1992. Political parties and democracy in Central America. Boulder: Westview Press. Pages 135-160.
Eguizábal, Cristina. 1992. "El Salvador: procesos electorales y democratización." Una tarea inconclusa: elecciones y democracia en America Latina: 1988-1991. 1992. San Jose: IIDH—CAPEL. Pages 41–65.
García, José Z. 1989. "El Salvador: recent elections in historical perspective." Booth, John A. and Mitchell A. Seligson, eds. 1989. Elections and democracy in Central America. Chapel Hill: The University of North Carolina Press. Pages 60–92.
Haggerty, Richard A., ed. 1990. El Salvador, a country study. Washington: Library of Congress, Federal Research Division.
Karl, Terry. 1986. "Imposing consent? Electoralism vs. Democratization in El Salvador." Drake, Paul W. and Eduardo Silva, eds. 1986. Elections and democratization in Latin America, 1980-1985. La Jolla: Center for Iberian and Latin American Studies, Center for U.S.-Mexican Studies, Institute of the Americas, University of California, San Diego. Pages 9–36.
Lungo Uclés, Mario. 1996. El Salvador in the eighties: counterinsurgency and revolution. Philadelphia: Temple University Press. (Based on his El Salvador en los 80: contrainsurgencia y revolución. 1990. San Jose: EDUCA—FLACSO.)
Montes, Segundo. 1988. "Las elecciones del 20 de marzo de 1988." Estudios centroamericanos (ECA) 43, 473-474:175-190 (marzo-abril 1988).
Montgomery, Tommie Sue. 1985. "El Salvador." Latin America and Caribbean Contemporary Record IV:471-502 (1984–1985).
Montgomery, Tommie Sue. 1995. Revolution in El Salvador: from civil strife to civil peace. Boulder: Westview.
Sharpe, Kenneth E. 1986. "El Salvador." Latin America and Caribbean Contemporary Record V:B275-B298 (1985–1986).

Legislative elections in El Salvador
1985 in El Salvador
El Salvador